Greenwoods Corner is an Auckland neighbourhood located within the suburb of Epsom, situated to the south of Newmarket and to the north of Royal Oak, at the intersection of Pah Road and Manukau Road. It is settled in the lee of Maungakiekie / One Tree Hill and serves as a convenient launching point for the area's many attractions.  Cornwall Park with Maungakiekie and the Stardome Observatory, Alexandra Park with its harness-racing track, and Monte Cecilia Park with the Pah Homestead and TSB Bank Wallace Arts Centre are all a convenient distance from Greenwoods Corner (within 2.5 km ).

Greenwoods Corner shopping village is made up of a collection of small enterprises: restaurants, cafés, and retail businesses. It is located only 7.3 kilometers from the Auckland Central Business District (CBD).

History
Greenwoods Corner was named after an early English landowner, Mr William Greenwood, who purchased the six acres that became Greenwoods Corner for 43 pounds, 5 shillings, and 8 pence in 1842. Greenwood built a homestead on a triangular section and sold the remaining land to a syndicate for a subdivision in 1909. The Greenwood family kept the homestead for 110 years, a significant period of time considering Auckland's short history as a city.

During its early development Greenwoods Corner was defined by Manukau Road on the east, Pah Road on the west, and Mount Albert Road at its base (south).  Southern Epsom was rural at the time of the first homestead of Greenwoods Corner and was characterized by green fields and grazing cattle. Originally two Norfolk pines framed the Greenwood Homestead at the triangle in the road, as defining features of the community. Both the pines and the homestead were pulled down by the city for a road widening and improvement scheme in 1954 and the Auckland Savings Bank now stands in the homestead's place.

Politics
Greenwoods Corner falls within the Maungakiekie constituency for the Parliament.  In terms of local government, Greenwoods Corner comes under the Albert-Eden Local Board,  of Auckland Council. The Albert-Eden Local Board includes the suburbs of Waterview, Point Chevalier, Sandringham, Mount Albert, Morningside, Owairaka, Balmoral, Kingsland, Mount Eden, Epsom and Greenlane.

Maungakiekie / One Tree Hill

The dominant landmark for Greenwoods Corner is Maungakiekie / One Tree Hill one of Auckland's many volcanic peaks.  Maungakiekie is Auckland's third largest volcanic peak at 183 meters high with three craters. Maungakiekie was the largest and most important Māori pā in pre-European time, and was famed for kumara gardens covering 1,000 hectares.

Maungakiekie is the Maori name for the mountain; Sir John Logan Campbell named it One Tree Hill after a totara tree that stood alone on its summit. This tree was felled by a European settler in the 1850s. Logan Campbell planted a grove of trees in replacement, but only a single Monterey pine tree survived. This solitary tree became a distinctive feature of Auckland's skyline until it was removed for safety reasons in 2001 after earlier attacks from Maori activists in 1994 and 2000.  An obelisk was erected at the top of the hill for Auckland's centenary celebrations in 1940 to honour both the Maori people of Tamaki-makau-rau and Logan Campbell.

Local Personalities
Mr William Greenwood (1806–1895)   was born in Brighton, England, but spent his early life in Bradford, Yorkshire. He travelled to Wellington, New Zealand in September 1840 before moving to Auckland after an earthquake hit Wellington. Greenwood was a stonemason by trade and was engaged by the government to build old St Paul's Church, completed in 1844.   Greenwood's trowel was used by Governor Hobson when he laid the first foundation stone of St Paul's Church; the trowel was later presented to the city of Auckland by George S. Graham on behalf of Greenwood in 1894. It is now in the collection of the Auckland Art Gallery.

Sir John Logan Campbell (1817–1912) 

John Logan Campbell was born in Edinburgh, Scotland. He studied medicine at the University of Edinburgh, but chose not to practice and instead was drawn overseas first to New South Wales in Australia and then on to New Zealand. Dr John Logan Campbell purchased 1,000 acre suburban farm located at Maungakiekie in September 1853, which he renamed One Tree Hill.

Dr Campbell made his name through different business enterprises and his political life, serving on more than 40 committees, boards, trusts or directorates over the space of five decades. He also served as Mayor for Auckland for three months during the Royal visit of the Duke and Duchess of Cornwall in 1901. The visit prompted Campbell to donate part of his estate, 230 acres of One Tree Hill, to the nation and calling this Cornwall Park in honour of the future king. The following year Dr Campbell was made a Bachelor Knight on the day intended as the coronation day of Edward VII, 26 June 1902.

Sir John Logan Campbell died on 22 June 1912, he was survived by his wife, most of their children had predeceased them both. The city of Auckland considered it the passing of one of their patriarchs.

Transport
Greenwoods Corner is easily accessible by bus from the Central Business District and Southern Auckland. By vehicle, Greenwoods Corner can be accessed from the Southern Motorway (SH1) by taking the exit for Market Road and from the South Western Motorway (SH20) by taking the exit for Queenstown Road off of the roundabout.

References

External links
Greenwoods Corner Epsom Business Association
Cornwall Park
U2 - One Tree Hill - video live

Suburbs of Auckland